The 2004 Formula Renault 2000 Eurocup season was the fourteenth Eurocup Formula Renault 2.0 season. The season began at Monza on 27 March and finished at Oschersleben on 18 September, after seventeen races.

American driver Scott Speed scored eight victories at Hockenheimring, Brno, Circuit de Spa-Francorchamps, Imola and Oschersleben during the season. He took the championship with a round to spare at the wheel of his Motopark Academy-run car, giving team based at Oschersleben their first Eurocup championship after double win on fellow circuit. Second place was not resolved until the final round, as Graff Racing's Simon Pagenaud and Jenzer Motorsport's Colin Fleming battled over the placing. Despite that Fleming was ahead of Pagenaud in both races of final round and scored more points, the French driver became runner-up.

JD Motorsport's Reinhard Kofler took fourth place with one victory at Valencia and took three further podium finishes to confirm fourth. Fleming's team-mate Pascal Kochem won race at Imola and completed the top-five.  Cram Competition's Pastor Maldonado won both races in opening round at Monza on his way to eighth place. Other races were won by French drivers Patrick Pilet and Yann Clairay who completed the top-ten. Guest Formula Renault 2000 UK driver Mike Conway claimed win at Donington Park.

Teams and drivers

Calendar
All races were part of LG Super Racing Weekends, that also included FIA GT Championship and Formula Renault V6 Eurocup.

Championship standings

Drivers
Points are awarded to the drivers as follows:

Races : 2 races of 25 minutes by rounds.

Teams

References

Eurocup
Eurocup Formula Renault
Renault Eurocup